Borough of Rochdale may refer to three things associated with Rochdale, England:

 Metropolitan Borough of Rochdale, a current borough of Greater Manchester, covering the town of Rochdale and the surrounding area
 Rochdale Borough Council, local government for the current borough
 County Borough of Rochdale (1856–1974), former local government district of Lancashire, covering just the town of Rochdale